This article is a list of results of the 2006 World Series of Poker (WSOP) with statistics, final table results and payouts.
The total money paid out in the 2006 events was $156,409,974.

Results

Event 1: $500 No Limit Hold 'em--Casino Employees

This event kicked off the 2006 WSOP. It was a $500 buy-in no limit Texas hold 'em tournament reserved for casino employees that work in Nevada.

 Number of buy-ins: 1,232
 Total Prize Pool: $554,400
 Number of Payouts: 101
 Winning Hand:  3♣

Event 2: $1,500 No Limit Hold 'em
This event was a $1,500 buy-in no-limit Texas hold 'em tournament.  It was the first public tournament of the 2006 WSOP.

 Number of buy-ins: 2,776
 Total Prize Pool: $3,789,240
 Number of Payouts: 277
 Winning Hand: Q♠

Event 3: $1,500 Pot Limit Hold 'em
This event was a $1,500 buy-in pot limit Texas hold 'em tournament.  It was a three-day event with a first prize of $345,984.

 Number of buy-ins: 1,102
 Total Prize Pool: $1,504,230
 Number of Payouts: 99
 Winning Hand:

Event 4: $1,500 Limit Hold 'em
This event was a $1,500 buy-in limit Texas hold 'em tournament.  It was a three-day event with a first prize of $335,289.

 Number of buy-ins: 1,068
 Total Prize Pool: $1,457,820
 Number of Payouts: 100
 Winning Hand: 6♠

Event 5: $2,500 No Limit Hold 'em short-handed
This event was a $2,500 buy-in no limit Texas hold 'em tournament, with a maximum of six players per table instead of the normal nine. It was a three-day event with a first prize of $475,712.

 Number of buy-ins: 824
 Total Prize Pool: $1,895,200
 Number of Payouts: 90
 Winning Hand:

Event 6: $2,000 No Limit Hold 'em
This event was a $2,000 buy-in no limit Texas hold 'em tournament.  It was a three-day event with a first prize of $803,274.

 Number of buy-ins: 1,919
 Total Prize Pool: $3,492,580
 Number of Payouts: 155
 Winning Hand: Q♣ T♣

Event 7: $3,000 Limit Hold 'em
This event was a $3,000 buy-in limit Texas hold 'em tournament.  It was a three-day event with a first prize of $343,618.

 Number of buy-ins: 415
 Total Prize Pool: $1,145,400
 Number of Payouts: 46
 Winning Hand:

Event 8: $2,000 Omaha Hi-low Split
This event was a $2,000 buy-in Limit Omaha High-low split. It was a three-day event with a first prize of $341,426.

 Number of buy-ins: 670
 Total Prize Pool: $1,219,400
 Number of Payouts: 65
 Winning Hand:  7♣ 

This was the first of four top-three finishes for Madsen at this year's WSOP.

Event 9: $5,000 No Limit Hold'em

 Number of buy-ins: 622
 Total Prize Pool: $2,293,400
 Number of Payouts: 63
 Winning Hand:

Event 10: $1,500 7 Card Stud

 Number of buy-ins: 478
 Total Prize Pool: $652,470
 Number of Payouts: 40
 Winning Hand: K♠  4♣ 6♠ 4♠

Event 11: $1,500 Limit Hold'em

 Number of buy-ins: 701
 Total prize pool: $956,865
 Number of Payouts: 72
 Winning Hand:  3♠

Event 12: $5,000 Omaha Hi-low Split
This event was a $5,000 buy-in Limit Omaha High-low split. It was a two-day event with a first prize of $398,560.

 Number of buy-ins: 265
 Total Prize Pool: $1,245,000
 Number of Payouts: 26

Event 13: $2,500 No Limit Hold'em
This was a three-day event.

 Number of buy-ins: 1,290
 Total Prize Pool: $2,967,000
 Number of Payouts: 99
 Winning Hand: J♣ 8♣

Event 14: $1,000 No Limit Hold'em with rebuys
This was a three-day event.

 Number of buy-ins: 752
 Number of rebuys: 1,670
 Total Prize Pool: $2,317,887
 Number of Payouts: 74
 Winning Hand: A♣

Event 15: $1,000 Ladies No Limit Hold'em
This was a two-day event for women only.

 Number of buy-ins: 1,128
 Total Prize pool: $1,026,480
 Number of Payouts: 99

2005 winner, actress Jennifer Tilly did not reach the money this year. Mimi Rogers reached 33rd place, winning $5,132.

Event 16: $10,000 Pot-Limit Omaha
This was a three-day event.

 Number of buy-ins: 218
 Total Prize Pool: $2,049,200
 Number of Payouts: 27

Event 17: $1,000 No Limit Hold'em
This was a three-day event.

 Number of buy-ins: 2,891
 Total Prize Pool: $2,630,810
 Number of Payouts: 270

Event 18: $2,000 Pot Limit Hold'em
This was a three-day event.

 Number of buy-ins: 590
 Total Prize Pool: $1,073,800
 Number of Payouts: 54

Event 19: $1,000 Seniors No Limit Hold'em
This was a two-day event.

 Number of buy-ins: 1,184
 Total Prize Pool: $1,077,440
 Number of Payouts: 99

Event 20: $50,000 H.O.R.S.E.
This was a three-day event alternating between limit Texas Hold'em, Omaha Hi-Lo, Razz, Seven Card Stud and Seven Card Stud Hi-Lo Eight or Better. For the final table, the play was shifted exclusively to no limit hold'em. This event has the highest buy-in ever at the WSOP.

 Number of buy-ins: 143
 Total Prize Pool: $6,864,000
 Number of Payouts: 16

Event 21: $2,500 No Limit Hold'em Shorthanded
This was a three-day event, with a maximum of six players per table instead of the normal nine.

 Number of buy-ins: 740
 Total Prize Pool: $1,702,000
 Number of Payouts: 72

This was William Chen's second first-place finish and fifth in-the-money finish in this year's WSOP.

Event 22: $2,000 No Limit Hold'em
This was a three-day event.

 Number of buy-ins: 1,579
 Total Prize Pool: $2,873,780
 Number of Payouts: 156

Jeff Madsen became the youngest bracelet winner, defeating the record set the previous year by Eric Froehlich.

Event 23: $3,000 Limit Hold'em
This was a three-day event.

 Number of buy-ins: 341
 Total Prize Pool: $941,160
 Number of payouts: 37

Event 24: $3,000 Omaha Hi-low Split
This was a three-day event.

 Number of buy-ins: 352
 Total Prize Pool: $971,520
 Number of payouts: 36

Event 25: $2,000 No Limit Hold'em Shootout
This was a three-day event.

 Number of buy-ins: 600
 Total Prize Pool: $1,092,000 Number of payouts: 100 Event 26: $1,500 Pot Limit Omaha
This was a two-day event.

 Number of buy-ins: 526 Total Prize Pool: $716,625 Number of payouts: 54Special event: $1,500 Pot Limit Omaha with Rebuys
This was a special, non scheduled event.  

 Number of buy-ins: 158 Number of rebuys: 492 Total Prize Pool: $908,100 Number of payouts: 18 Event 27: $1,500 No Limit Hold'em
This was a two-day event.

 Number of buy-ins: 2,126 Total Prize Pool: $2,901,990 Number of payouts: 198 Event 28: $5,000 Seven Card Stud
This was a two-day event.

 Number of buy-ins: 183 Total Prize Pool: $855,400 Number of payouts: 16 Event 29: $2,500 Pot Limit Hold'em
This was a three-day event.

 Number of buyins: 562 Total Prize Pool: $1,292,600 Number of payouts: 54 Event 30: $5,000 No Limit Hold'em Shorthanded
This is a three-day event, with a maximum of six players per table.

 Number of buy-ins: 507 Total Prize Pool: $2,382,900 Number of payouts: 54Jeff Madsen, who became the youngest bracelet winner about a week earlier, won his second bracelet and made his third final table appearance at this year's WSOP.

 Event 31: $2,000 No Limit Hold'em
This is a three-day event.

 Number of buy-ins: 2,050 Total Prize Pool: $3,731,000 Number of payouts: 198 Event 32: $5,000 Pot Limit Hold'em
This is a three-day event.

  Number of buy-ins: 378 Total Prize Pool: $1,776,600 Number of payouts: 37 Event 33: $1,500 Seven Card Razz
This is a two-day event.

 Number of buy-ins: 409 Total Prize Pool: $558,285 Number of payouts: 40 Event 34: $1,000 No Limit Hold'em with rebuys
This is a three-day event.

 Number of buy-ins: 754  Number of rebuys: 1,691 Total Prize Pool: $2,340,238 Number of payouts: 73Phil Hellmuth Jr tied legends Johnny Chan and Doyle Brunson for the most WSOP tournament wins with his 10th bracelet.

 Event 35: $1,000 Seven Card Stud Hi Low Split
This is a two-day event.Number of buy-ins: 788Total Prize Pool: $717,080Number of payouts: 72Jeff Madsen made his fourth final table appearance and fourth top-three finish in this year's WSOP. This was also the third poker variant in which Madsen made the final table this year, as he previously made final tables in Omaha and Texas hold 'em (twice).

 Event 36: $1,500 Limit Hold'em Shootout
This is a three-day event.Number of buy-ins: 524Total Prize Pool: $715,260Number of payouts: 54 Event 37: $1,500 No Limit Hold'em
This is a three-day event.Number of buy-ins: 2,803Number of payouts: 270 Event 38: $5,000 No Limit 2-7 Draw Lowball with rebuys
This is a two-day event.Number of buy-ins: 81Number of rebuys: 159Total prize pool: $1,164,048Number of payouts: 7 Event 39: $10,000 No Limit Hold'em Championship Event
This is the "Main Event". It started on July 28 and the final table took place on August 10. 

Jamie Gold took the bracelet, the title and the biggest ever payout in poker history, $12 million, after being the chip leader for most of the second week of the tournament. On the final table Gold eliminated seven of the eight opponents.Number of buy-ins: 8,773Total Prize Pool: $82,512,162Number of payouts: 873 Event 40: $1,000 No Limit Hold'em
This was a two-day event.Number of buy-ins: 1,100Total Prize Pool: $1,001,000Number of payouts: 102 Event 41: $1,500 No Limit Hold'em
This was a two-day event.Number of buy-ins: 1,007Total prize pool: $1,374,555Number of payouts: 102 Event 42: $1,500 No Limit Hold'em
This was a two-day event.Number of buy-ins: 352Total prize pool: $494,130Number of payouts: 38 Event 43: $1,500 No Limit Hold'em
This was a two-day event.Number of buy-ins: 420Total prize pool: $573,300Number of payouts: 39 Event 44: $1,500 No Limit Hold'em
This was a two-day event.Number of buy-ins: 481Total prize pool: $656,565Number of payouts: 46 Event 45: $1,500 No Limit Hold'em
This was a one-day event.Number of buy-ins: 494Total Prize Pool: $674,310Number of payouts: 47'''

External links
WSOP official site with complete results
Card Player Magazine with results and live updates

World Series of Poker
2006 in poker